Phyllocnistis xenia is a moth of the family Gracillariidae. It is found from Great Britain to Bulgaria and from Poland to the Iberian Peninsula and Italy.

The wingspan is 6–7 mm. Adults are on wing from July to August and again from September to May in two generations.

The larvae feed on Populus alba, Populus canescens and Populus tremula. They mine the leaves of their host plant. The mine consists of a long, rather broad, strictly epidermal corridor that curves in dense loops over the leaf upper-side, without ever crossing itself. The frass is deposited in a vague continuous central line. The gallery ends upon the leaf margin, where it widens a little, while the leaf margin folds over somewhat. Here pupation takes place. There is no cocoon.

Taxonomy
Phyllocnistis xenia might be a synonym of Phyllocnistis labyrinthella. The adult moth and pupa of xenia can hardly be distinguished from the one of labyrinthella. Many authors therefore consider the two conspecific. There seems to exist a constant difference in the frass line of xenia (which is broad, vague and greenish) and that of labyrinthella (which is narrow, sharp and brownish black). Furthermore, the mine of labyrinthella often extends to the underside of the leaf, something that does not seem to happen in xenia.

References

Phyllocnistis
Moths of Europe